"The Saint Louis Blues" (or "St. Louis Blues") is a popular American song composed by W. C. Handy in the blues style and published in September 1914. It was one of the first blues songs to succeed as a pop song and remains a fundamental part of jazz musicians' repertoire. Benny Goodman, Louis Armstrong, Cab Calloway, Bing Crosby, Bessie Smith, Eartha Kitt,  Count Basie, Glenn Miller, Guy Lombardo, Peanuts Hucko, and the Boston Pops Orchestra (under the directions of both Arthur Fiedler and Keith Lockhart) are among the artists who have recorded it. The song has been called "the jazzman's Hamlet". Composer William Grant Still arranged a version of the song in 1916 while working with Handy.

The 1925 version sung by Bessie Smith, with Louis Armstrong on cornet, was inducted into the Grammy Hall of Fame in 1993. The 1929 version by Louis Armstrong & His Orchestra (with Red Allen) was inducted in 2008.

History

Handy said he had been inspired by a chance meeting with a woman on the streets of St. Louis, Missouri, distraught over her husband's absence, who lamented, "Ma man's got a heart like a rock cast in de sea", a key line of the song. Handy's autobiography recounts his hearing the tune in St. Louis in 1892: "It had numerous one-line verses and they would sing it all night."

The song was a massive and enduring success. The original published sheet music is available online from the United States Library of Congress in a searchable database of African-American music from Brown University.

Analysis
The form is unusual in that the verses are the now-familiar standard twelve-bar blues in common time with three lines of lyrics, the first two lines repeated, but it also has a 16-bar bridge written in the habanera rhythm, which Jelly Roll Morton called the "Spanish tinge" and characterized by Handy as tango. The tango-like rhythm is notated as a dotted quarter note followed by an eighth note and two quarter notes, with no slurs or ties. It is played in the introduction and in the sixteen-measure bridge.

While blues often became simple and repetitive in form, "Saint Louis Blues" has multiple complementary and contrasting strains, similar to classic ragtime compositions. Handy said his objective in writing the song was "to combine ragtime syncopation with a real melody in the spiritual tradition." T-Bone Walker commented about the song, "You can't dress up the blues... I'm not saying that 'Saint Louis Blues' isn't fine music you understand. But it just isn't blues".

Performances
Writing about the first time "Saint Louis Blues" was played (1914), Handy noted that

Singer and actress Ethel Waters was the first woman to sing "Saint Louis Blues" in public. She said she learned it from Charles Anderson and featured it herself during a 1917 engagement in Baltimore.

Researcher Guy Marco, in his Encyclopedia of Recorded Sound in the United States, stated that the first audio recording of "Saint Louis Blues" was by Al Bernard in July 1918 for Vocalion Records. However, the house band at Columbia Records, directed by Charles A. Prince, released an instrumental version in December 1915.

The film St. Louis Blues, from 1929, featured Bessie Smith singing the song.

Other recorded versions

 Prince's Orchestra (1916)
 Al Bernard (1919)
 Marion Harris (1920)
 Original Dixieland Jass Band (1921)
 W. C. Handy (1923)
 Bessie Smith with Louis Armstrong (1925)
 Fats Waller (1926)
 Al Bernard as "John Bennett" (Madison, 1928)
 Louis Armstrong (1929)
 Cab Calloway (1930)
 Rudy Vallée (1930)
 The Mills Brothers (1932)
 Benny Goodman (1936)
 Django Reinhardt (1937)
 Guy Lombardo (1939)
 Earl Hines (1940)
 Dizzy Gillespie (1949)
 Louis Armstrong – Louis Armstrong Plays W.C. Handy (1954)
 Gil Evans with Cannonball Adderley – New Bottle Old Wine (1958)
 Dizzy Gillespie – Have Trumpet, Will Excite! (1959)
 Dave Brubeck – At Carnegie Hall (1963)
 Juan García Esquivel (1966)
 The Thad Jones/Mel Lewis Orchestra – Monday Night (1968)
 Eumir Deodato – Artistry (1974)
 George Wright – Red Hot and Blue (1984)
 Herbie Hancock with Stevie Wonder – Gershwin's World (1998)

See also
List of pre-1920 jazz standards

References

.

External links
 
 
 Sheet Music at Brown University digital repository
 

1914 songs
1925 singles
Saint Louis Blues
Original Dixieland Jass Band songs
Nat King Cole songs
Louis Armstrong songs
Cab Calloway songs
LaVern Baker songs
1910s jazz standards
Songs about cities in the United States
Songs with music by W. C. Handy
Benny Goodman songs
Blues songs
Bessie Smith songs
Billie Holiday songs
Lena Horne songs
Mildred Bailey songs
Grammy Hall of Fame Award recipients
Grammy Award for Best Instrumental Arrangement Accompanying Vocalist(s)
Jazz compositions in G major
Songs about St. Louis